Barbatteius is an extinct genus of teiid lizard represented by the type species Barbatteius vremiri from the Late Cretaceous of Romania. B. vremiri was named in 2016 on the basis of a well preserved skull from the Haţeg Basin and differs from other teiids in having more prominent osteoderms covering the skull roof. Barbatteius lived on Haţeg Island during the early Maastrichtian stage and was part of an isolated island fauna. However, its close affinities with teiids from Gondwana and its co-occurrence with paramacellodid and borioteiioid lizards from Euramerica suggests that Haţeg Island was colonized by lizards multiple times from many different areas of the world.

References 

Late Cretaceous lepidosaurs of Europe
Maastrichtian life
Cretaceous Romania
Fossils of Romania
Fossil taxa described in 2015